This is a summary of 1920 in music in the United Kingdom.

Events
February – The Philharmonic Choir, under its founder Charles Kennedy Scott, appears at a Philharmonic Society concert giving the first performance of Frederick Delius's A Song of the High Hills.
March – Adrian Boult conducts Edward Elgar's second Symphony at the Queen's Hall to "great applause" and "frantic enthusiasm",
April – Irish composer Hamilton Harty is appointed resident conductor of the Hallé Orchestra.
May – Noël Coward's comedy I'll Leave It to You becomes his first full-length play to be staged in London's West End. 
4 September – City of Birmingham Orchestra holds its first rehearsals (in a police bandroom). Later in the month, it holds first concert, conducted by Appleby Matthews, including Granville Bantock's overture Saul.
November – City of Birmingham Orchestra gives its "First  Symphony Concert", with Edward Elgar conducting a programme of his own music in Birmingham Town Hall.
15 November – The first complete public performance of Gustav Holst's suite The Planets (including "Neptune") is given in London by the London Symphony Orchestra, conducted by Albert Coates.
15 December – Vaughan Williams' The Lark Ascending is premiered in its original version for violin and piano with Marie Hall as violinist at Shirehampton near Bristol.
December – Sir Thomas Beecham is forced to disband the Beecham Opera Company because of financial difficulties.

Popular music
 "Black Stitchel", w. Wilfrid Wilson Gibson, m. Ivor Gurney
 "I Belong to Glasgow", w.m. Will Fyffe

Classical music: new works
Granville Bantock – Arabian Nights
 Arnold Bax – Phantasy for viola and orchestra
 Arthur Bliss
The Tempest, overture and interludes;
Concerto for piano, tenor voice, strings and percussion
Rout (for soprano and chamber orchestra)
 Frederick Delius – Hassan
Ivor Gurney – War Elegy
Basil Harwood – Christmastide
Dorothy Howell – Two Dances
John Blackwood McEwen – String Quartet No. 9 in B minor
Charles Villiers Stanford – Sonata "Celtica" No. 4, Op. 153
 Ralph Vaughan Williams 
The Lark Ascending
Mass in G minor
A London Symphony

Musical theatre
18 September – A Night Out, with a book by George Grossmith, Jr. and Arthur Miller, music by Willie Redstone and Cole Porter and lyrics by Clifford Grey, opens at the Winter Garden Theatre in London, where it runs for 309 performances. The original cast includes Leslie Henson and Stanley Holloway.

Births
9 January – Clive Dunn, comedy actor and chart-topping singer (died 2012)
12 April – The Cox Twins, music hall entertainers (Frank, died 2007, and Fred, died 2013)
14 April – Ivor Forbes Guest, historian of dance (died 2018)
13 May – Gareth Morris, flautist (died 2007)
20 May – Betty Driver, singer and actress (died 2011)
19 June – Johnny Douglas, film composer and conductor (died 2003)
24 October – Steve Conway, singer (died 1952)
12 December – Dick James, singer and record producer (died 1986)

Deaths
21 January – John Henry Maunder, composer, 61
24 January – Percy French, Irish-born songwriter, 65 (pneumonia)
7 April – Alice Elgar, wife of composer Edward Elgar, 72 (lung cancer)
5 May – Robert Bryan, poet and composer, 61
28 May - Hardwicke Rawnsley, hymn-writer, 68
28 June - Pauline Rita, singer and actress, about 78
14 December – George J. Gaskin, Irish singer, 57

See also
 1920 in the United Kingdom

References

British Music, 1920 in
Music
British music by year
1920s in British music